Susannah Heschel (born 15 May 1956) is an American scholar and the Eli M. Black Distinguished Professor of Jewish Studies at Dartmouth College. The author and editor of numerous books and articles, she is a Guggenheim Fellow and the recipient of numerous awards, including four honorary doctorates. Heschel's scholarship focuses on Jewish and Christian interactions in Germany during the nineteenth and twentieth centuries. She is the daughter of Abraham Joshua Heschel, one of the leading Jewish theologians and Jewish philosophers of the 20th century.

Career
In 1972, Heschel asked the Jewish Theological Seminary in New York to consider her application to its rabbinical school, although she knew it did not ordain women at that time.

Heschel started a custom in the early 1980s, in which some Jews include an orange on the Passover Seder plate, representing the fruitfulness for all Jews when marginalized Jews, particularly women and gay people, are allowed to become active and contribute to the Jewish community. The tradition began when Heschel spoke at Hillel at Oberlin College, where she saw an early feminist haggadah that recommended adding a crust of bread to the Seder plate as a sign of solidarity with lesbian Jews. She felt putting bread on the Seder plate would mean accepting the idea that lesbian and gay Jews are as incompatible with Judaism as chametz is with Passover. At her next Seder, she used an orange as a symbol of inclusion for lesbians, gays, and others who are marginalized by the Jewish community. Today, one can purchase Seder plates made with seven spots—as opposed to the traditional six—to include an orange on the Seder plate.

Heschel received her doctorate from the University of Pennsylvania in 1989. She served as lecturer and then assistant professor of Religious Studies at Southern Methodist University from 1988 to 1991, and as Abba Hillel Silver associate professor of Jewish studies at Case Western Reserve University from 1991 to 1998. She was a Rockefeller Fellow at the National Humanities Center in 1997-98, received a Carnegie Foundation Fellowship in Islamic Studies in 2008, and spent two years at the Center for the Humanities at Tufts University. In 2013 she was awarded a Guggenheim Fellowship.

In 2005, she received an academic fellowship from the Ford Foundation, which she used to convene a series of international conferences, held at Dartmouth College, that brought together scholars in the fields of Jewish Studies and Islamic Studies to discuss a range of issues. One of those conferences honored the Arab philosopher Sadik al-Azm; another examined "Ink and Blood: Textuality and the Humane", at which Quranic scholar Angelika Neuwirth delivered the opening keynote address. In 2011-12 she held a fellowship at the Wissenschaftskolleg in Berlin. She received a Guggenheim Fellowship in 2013. Frequently in Germany to lecture, she serves on the Beirat of the Zentrum Jüdische Studien in Berlin.

In 1992-93 she was the Martin Buber visiting professor of Jewish religious philosophy at the University of Frankfurt; she has also taught at the University of Edinburgh, the University of Cape Town, and Princeton University.

Heschel is an honorary trustee of The Heschel School in New York.

Published work
Her monograph Abraham Geiger and the Jewish Jesus (1998, University of Chicago Press) won the Abraham Geiger Prize of the Geiger College in Germany and a National Jewish Book Award. She has also written The Aryan Jesus: Christian Theologians and the Bible in Nazi Germany (2008, Princeton University Press) and has edited Moral Grandeur and Spiritual Audacity: Essays of Abraham Joshua Heschel, Betrayal: German Churches and the Holocaust (with Robert P. Ericksen), Insider/Outsider: American Jews and Multiculturalism (with David Biale and Michael Galchinsky), and On Being a Jewish Feminist.

She has also co-edited, with Christopher Browning and Michael Marrus, Holocaust Scholarship: Personal Trajectories and Professional Interpretations. With Umar Ryad, she co-edited The Muslim Reception of European Orientalism. In 2018 she published Jüdischer Islam: Islam und jüdisch-deutsche Selbstbestimmung. Among her recent articles are "The Slippery Yet Tenacious Nature of Racism: New Developments in Critical Race Theory and Their Implications for the Study of Religion and Ethics", "Jewish and Muslim Feminist Theologies in Dialogue: Discourses of Difference", "Constructions of Jewish Identity through Reflections on Islam", and "German Jewish Scholarship on Islam as a Tool for De-Orientalizing Judaism".

Honors
Heschel has received an honorary doctorate in humane letters from Colorado College, an honorary doctorate of sacred letters from the University of St. Michael's College, an honorary Doctor of Divinity degree from Trinity College, an honorary doctorate from the Augustana Theologische Hochschule, the John M. Manley Huntington award from Dartmouth, and the Jacobus Family Fellowship from Dartmouth, and she was elected an honorary member of Phi Beta Kappa.

In 2006, Heschel served on the Green Zionist Alliance slate to the World Zionist Congress. In 2015, she delivered a series of five lectures on Zionism for the internet site of Hadassah, the international women's Zionist organization.

Personal life
In 1995, Heschel married James Aronson. They have two daughters, one named for three sisters of Heschel's father who were murdered in the Holocaust.

References

External links 
 Dartmouth Faculty Page

1956 births
American historians of religion
American people of Polish-Jewish descent
Dartmouth College faculty
Harvard University alumni
Historians of Jews and Judaism
Jewish American writers
Jewish feminists
Jewish scholars
Judaic scholars
Living people
Trinity College (Connecticut) alumni
University of Pennsylvania alumni
American Zionists
21st-century American Jews
Jewish women writers